The 6"/30 caliber gun Mark 1 (spoken "six-inch-thirty-caliber") were used for the primary battery of the United States Navy's dispatch vessel  with the Mark 2 being used in the secondary batteries for its "New Navy" protected cruisers , , and  and the Mark 3 used for the primary and secondary batteries in the succeeding early protected cruisers in addition to secondary batteries in the "Second Class Battleships"  and .

Design
The 6-inch/30 caliber Mark 1, 2, and 3 guns were developed before the Spanish–American War and still used black powder or brown powder, in later years they were not considered strong enough to withstand the higher chamber pressures generated by the newer smokeless powder adopted around 1898 and were obsolete before the start of World War I.

The Mark 1, gun No. 1, was constructed of tube, jacket, 16 hoops, an elevating band and integral trunnions with a screwed on muzzle bell. The Mark 2 also trunnioned with the Mark 2 Mod 1 only having 10 hoops, jacket, and chamber liner and the Mod 2 the same but with a full length liner. All Mark 1 and Mark 2 guns were constructed to a length of 30 calibers. In 1895 all Mark 2s were ordered to be converted to rapid-fire, fixed ammunition. This was done in 1898–1902 with gun No. 2 being delivered in November 1898 for use in Atlanta.

The Mark 3 was trunnioned as the Mark 1 and Mark 2, but was built in three different caliber lengths, 30, 35, and 40, in eight different Mods, Mod 0 – Mod 6 and Mod's 8 and 9. Mod 0 was 30 caliber with Mod 1 being 35 caliber. All 30 and 35 caliber Mods had a liner, 10 hoops, and a jacket. Mod 2 was 40 caliber with only eight hoops. Mod 3 was again 30 caliber but introduced the use of case (semi-fixed) ammunition. The Mod 4 was experimental in that it eliminated the trunnions and used a threaded sleeve. Mod 5s were reworked Mod 1s making them capable of handling case ammunition. As with the Mod 5 the Mod 6 were Mod 2s reworked to handle case ammunition. The Mod 7 was skipped and no drawings exist for this Mod. The Mod 8 was another Mod 2 rework, this time removing the trunnions and using a threaded sleeve. The last Mod was the Mod 9, using a Mod 3 gun and giving it a full length liner.

Naval Service

Preserved weapons
At least five guns of this type are preserved:
 One gun from Maine (ACR-1) in Washington, DC at the National Museum of the United States Navy.
 One gun from Maine (ACR-1) in Portland, Maine at Fort Allen Park.
 One gun from Maine (ACR-1) at the city hall in Alpena, Michigan.
 Two guns from Concord (PG-3) at the Veterans Memorial Museum, Chehalis, Washington.

See also

Weapons of comparable role, performance and era
 BL 6 inch gun Mk II – VI approximate British equivalent

Notes

References

Books
 
Online sources

Further reading

External links

 Bluejackets Manual, 1917, 4th revision: US Navy 14-inch Mark 1 gun

Naval guns of the United States
152 mm artillery